By-elections to the 14th Canadian Parliament were held to elect members of the House of Commons of Canada between the 1921 federal election and the 1925 federal election. The Liberal Party of Canada led the government, which fluctuated between a minority and majority, for the 14th Canadian Parliament.

The list includes Ministerial by-elections which occurred due to the requirement that Members of Parliament recontest their seats upon being appointed to Cabinet. These by-elections were almost always uncontested. This requirement was abolished in 1931.

See also
List of federal by-elections in Canada

References
 Parliament of Canada–Elected in By-Elections 

1924 elections in Canada
1923 elections in Canada
1922 elections in Canada
14th